Michael Roth (born 15 February 1962) is a German former handball player who competed in the 1984 Summer Olympics.

He was a member of the West German handball team which won the silver medal. He played two matches and scored two goals.

His twin brother Ulrich Roth was also a team member.

Michael Roth was the HSG Wetzlar Bundesliga team's coach in 2009.

From 1 October 2020, he will be coaching the Bahrain national team.

References

External links

1962 births
Living people
German male handball players
Handball players at the 1984 Summer Olympics
Olympic handball players of West Germany
Olympic medalists in handball
Medalists at the 1984 Summer Olympics
Olympic silver medalists for West Germany
Handball-Bundesliga players
German expatriate sportspeople in Australia
Sportspeople from Heidelberg